The "Circle of Veles" (Commonwealth of Slavic Rodnovery Communities) is an association of communities passionate about the development of Slavic native spirituality. Their patron is the god Veles, the Slavic god of wisdom. The supreme god is considered to be Rod, thus it is a Rodnovery (neo-pagan) association, common to Russia, Ukraine and Belarus. 

The association emphasizes the veneration of deities of the earth, similar to Indian tantrism.  It is not affiliated with political movements, and does not practice racial or religious discrimination. The leader of the association is Ilya Cherkasov (Veleslav).

History 
Gasanov received "initiation" from the Nizhny Novgorod sorcerer Rodoliub (Rybin). In 1994–1997, he maintained close contacts with the "Union of Venedi". Community "Trajan" until the end of 1998 with close interaction with the Kaluga Slavic community of Vadim Kazakov (student of Alexey Dobrovolsky - Dobroslav). In 1997, Kazakov became the leader of the Union of Slavic Native Belief Communities (SSO SRV), which included the Bogumil community. In December 1998, this community was expelled from the SSO SRV and changed its name first to Obninsk Slavic Community "Triglav" and then to Obninsk Rodnovery Community "Triglav".

In February 1998, the Aryan Pagan community "Satya-Veda", which included Veleslav, began operations in Moscow. Satya-Veda was soon transformed into the Russian-Slavic Rodoliubie community. It developed close contacts with Velimir's group, which was the beginning of their merger into the Rodoliubie – Kolyada Vyatichi Community Accord in 2001. They soon split up.

In Moscow, until the mid-2000s, the "Moscow Velesov community" operated under the leadership of Volhv Velemir (A. Zhilko).

"Velesov Circle" was formed in 1999 in Moscow. The first to join it were the Russian-Slavic Rodnovery community of Veleslav and the Obninsk Triglav community of D. A. Hasanov (Bogumil Murin). Both communities later disintegrated. Then they were joined by five more communities, including the "Veles community" of A. Zhilko (Velemir), which included Alexei Nagovitsyn (Velemudr)

"The circle of Veles is governed by the Council of volhovs, the high priests and priests. The leader of the association is Ilya Cherkasov (Veleslav). There are communities in Moscow, Obninsk, Kostroma, Ryazan, Perm, Kazan, Komsomolsk-on-Amur and other Russian cities, in Ukraine and in Belarus. The main mass of the participants of the association are the Magi.

The head of the association, Ilya Cherkasov, is one of the most famous representatives of Slavic neo-paganism in Russia. In particular, he has participated in several television programs.

Ideology 

The Obninsk Vedic community of "Trajan" Volhvos was mainly engaged in "restoring Slavic ritualism". Kazakov and Bogumil made an attempt to streamline the "Slavic" (Rodnovery) pantheon of gods and rituals, publishing a book about it ("The World of Slavic Gods", 1997). They considered themselves the successors of Vyatichi, who resisted baptism longer than other Slavic tribes and now allegedly led the return to the "ancient primordial faith".

The Aryan pagan Satya Veda community chose the god Veles as its spiritual patron. The leaders and ordinary members of the community were young people not affiliated with political movements. They declared their openness and toleration and did not recognize racial, religious, or political discrimination. The community's program specifically stipulated distancing from extremist, in particular anti-Christian and anti-Jewish currents. However, members of the community (Veleslav, A. Arinushkin), along with other Rodnovers, wrote about the guilt of Christians in the inhuman treatment of pagans and the guilt of Prince Vladimir for his betrayal of his native culture. They associated the West with evil and the Kingdom of Death, but praised the "Reichsführer," who nevertheless "perverted the true Aryan Tradition". Veleslav, being a sorcerer of the Satya-Veda community, became the author of the doctrine of the Rodoliubrium – "the original ancestral faith of the Russians". According to this doctrine, pantheistic belief in a single comprehensive god Rood must be based on the Vedic worldview, veneration of ancestors and the division of society into castes. The reconstruction of the original "One Tradition" is made on the basis of archetypes "Russian (Slavic and Aryan) spirit" and archetypes of "Traditional Paganism" as such taking into account all spiritual experience accumulated by humanity (Satya Sanatana Dharma – true eternal religion-law stemming from the nature of reality). The publications of the Russian-Slavic Rodnovery community, formed from the Satya Veda community, emphasized patriotism and love for one's native land.

The "Veles Circle" is an association of communities passionate about the development of Slavic spirituality and standing apart from politics. The patron of the association is the god Veles as the "Slavic god of wisdom", and the supreme god is considered to be Rod. The calendar dates from 2409 B.C., from the foundation of Slovensk the Great. The association emphasizes the veneration of deities of the earth and the underground (analog of Indian tantrism). There are joint celebrations of Kupala, Perunov's Day and Koliada According to the "Word of the Veche Center and the Commonwealth of Pagan Associations" (2016), the representatives of the association consider the concepts of "Paganism", "Tradition", "Native Tradition" and "Native Faith" as identical. Veleslav published The Ritebook (2003), which establishes a system of rituals. Understanding Old Believerism as a commitment to tradition, Veleslav glorifies the spiritual leader of the Old Believers, Protopop Avvvakum, who "rebelled against Antichrist".

On September 15, 2000 ("832 years from the fall of the Jaromarsburg") in Kolomenskoye (Moscow) seventeen communities (including such communities as the "Moscow Veles community", Obninsk community "Triglav", community "Kolyada Vyatichi", Kirov community "Svetoslavichi", Vladivostok community "Shield of Semargl" and others) signed the "Kolomna Appeal to all the Pagan communities of Russia and the near abroad, which established the status of the Pagan faith and regulated the relationships between the communities. The communities of the Kolomna Pagans and the near abroad signed the "Kolomna Appeal to all Pagan communities in Russia and abroad", which established the status of the Pagan faith and regulated the relationship between the communities. The appeal declared the veche principle of leadership. In the text, the Pagan community was called a religious organization rather than a political one, even though questions of an ideological nature remained under its control. Tolerance for diversity was emphasized. In particular, such terms as "paganism", "Rodnovery", "Rodnovery", "Vedism", "Ynglism", "Orthodoxy", etc. were allowed for the name of their faith. The appeal demonstrated a desire for unity, and proclaimed "the inadmissibility of mutual blasphemy. The wish was expressed for regular meetings during the Days of Slavonic Script or Svyatoslav's Day, as well as the exchange of information. As a sign of agreement, a joint ritual was performed at the Alatyr Stone in the Vlesov tract near the village of Kolomenskoye.

In 2002, in memory of Academician B. A. Rybakov, whose controversial mythological constructions many Rodnovers use as a source, Veleslav published a brochure dedicated to "the revival of the original Russian-Slavic Rodnovery".

In 2005 Veleslav created the youth-oriented doctrine of Navoslavism, "The Way of the Left Hand," or "Shuyny Way".

In August 2008, after an act of vandalism at one of the temples, four associations, the "Union of Slavic Communities of Slavic Native Faith" (SSO SRV), "Circle of Pagan Tradition" (KJT), "Veles Circle" and "", began to unite by creating an advisory council of the four associations. It consisted of two representatives from each association, including Vadim Kazakov and Maxim Ionov (priest Beloyar) from SRV, Dmitry Gavrilov (sorcerer Iggeld) and Sergey Dorofeev (sorcerer Veledor) from KJT, and D. Hasanov (sorcerer Bogumil) from "Veles' circle". The ground for this was a joint statement against the desecration of sacred places revered by pagans, as well as a rejection of what they called "pseudo-paganism".. In 2011, the Schoron ezh Slovenes voluntarily left the council.

In May 2012, three neo-pagan associations in Russia (KNT, SSO SRV and "Velesov circle") entered into an agreement "On Slavic priests", in which, among other things, they recognized "pseudoscientific and harmful to Slavic faith" theories on the basis of mythology and folkloristics A. I. Asov (Busa Kresenya), V. Yu. Golyakov (Bogumil the Second), Yu. V. Gomonov, N. V. Levashov, A. V. Trekhlebov, V. A. Shemshuk; theories in the field of language, speech and traditional thinking by N. N. Vashkevich, G. S. Grinevich, M. N. Zadornov, A. Y. Khinevich, V. A. Chudinov; theories in the field of history – Yuri D. Petukhov, A. Tyunyaev, A. T. Fomenko, "as well as their successors, followers and their like".

The first clause of the agreement states that only representatives of "Slavic people" can be Slavic priests and priestesses, and in exceptional cases other bearers of "Indo-European tribal heritage and custom" who have adopted Slavic language, culture and "Native Faith" and have proven to belong to "Slavicness".

In December 2013, the SRV, Veles Circle, and KJT condemned Vladimir Kurovsky, leader of the "Ukrainian religious sect" Rodovoye Ognische Slavyanskoe Rodnoi Vera (Slavic Native Faith).

On August 27, 2016, in Kolomenskoye (Moscow) there was a meeting of eighteen magi and priests – representatives of a number of neo-pagan associations – Slavic, "Hellenic", North German, and followers of "European Witchcraft". The meeting was preceded by a long preliminary discussion by a working group of the vital problems of the neo-pagan movement. Represented at the meeting were: "Pagan Federation International" (PFI), SSO SRV, KJT, "Veles Circle", "Moscow Wiccan House", the Olympic Religious League "Liberation of Mind", the almanac "Saga" ("project of the Union of Free Asatru"), "Assembly of Slavic Communities Native Land". A "Veche Center of Pagan Associations" was formed, and in the following months its conceptual documents were adopted. This collegial body consists of 24 neo-pagan figures. It is proposed "to create a Commonwealth of associations (followers of the Natural Faith) in Russia, Belarus and other countries, united by a common historical and cultural space".

The sorcerer of the Moscow Veles community, Velemir (Zhilko), unlike many other Rodnovers, does not consider the term "paganism" offensive.

Notes

Literature 

 Научная
 
 
 
 
 
 
 
 
 
 
 

 Аффилированная

Links 

 
 Велесов круг. Славянский Информационный Портал (slawa.su).
 
 
 

Slavic Native Faith
Religious organizations established in 1999
Modern pagan organizations based in Russia
Modern pagan organizations established in the 1990s
Pages with unreviewed translations